Middle Brook is a river in Delaware County, New York and Schoharie County, New York. It flows into Charlotte Creek northeast of Davenport.

References

Rivers of New York (state)
Rivers of Delaware County, New York
Rivers of Schoharie County, New York